A crystal base for a representation of a quantum group on a -vector space
is not a base of that vector space but rather a -base of  where  is a -lattice in that vector spaces.

Definition

For simple root  and non-negative integer , define 

 

 is a free -submodule of  such that 
 is a -basis of the vector space  over 
 and 
 and 

A crystal base can be represented by a directed graph with labelled edges.

For any integrable module with a crystal base, the weight spectrum for the crystal base is the same as the weight spectrum for the module, and therefore the weight spectrum for the crystal base is the same as the weight spectrum for the corresponding module of the appropriate Kac–Moody algebra.  The multiplicities of the weights in the crystal base are also the same as their multiplicities in the corresponding module of the appropriate Kac–Moody algebra.

It is a theorem of Kashiwara that every integrable highest weight module has a crystal base.  Similarly, every integrable lowest weight module has a crystal base.

Tensor products of crystal bases

Let  be an integrable module with crystal base  and  be an integrable module with crystal base .  For crystal bases, the coproduct , given by 

is adopted.  The integrable module  has crystal base , where .  For a basis vector , define 

  

The decomposition of the product two integrable highest weight modules into irreducible submodules is determined by the decomposition of the graph of the crystal base into its connected components (i.e. the highest weights of the submodules are determined, and the multiplicity of each highest weight is determined).

References

External links

Lie algebras
Representation theory
Quantum groups